Paul Coady (born 1992 in Borris, County Carlow, Ireland) is an Irish sportsperson.  He plays hurling with his club Mount Leinster Rangers which he founded in 2011 and has been a member of the Carlow senior inter-county team since 2011.

With his club Mount Leinster Rangers he won Carlow Senior Hurling Championship in 2009 and 2011. In 2011 he was part of the Mount Leinster Rangers team that made history by becoming the first team from Carlow to win a Leinster hurling title when they won the Leinster Intermediate Club Hurling Championship.

References

1992 births
Living people
Mount Leinster Rangers hurlers
Carlow inter-county hurlers